The 2018 Eschborn-Frankfurt was a road cycling one-day race that took place on 1 May 2018 in Germany. It was the 57th edition of the Eschborn-Frankfurt and the twentieth event of the 2018 UCI World Tour.

European champion Alexander Kristoff won the race for a record fourth consecutive edition. Michael Matthews and Oliver Naesen took second and third place.

Result

References

2018 UCI World Tour
2018 in German sport
2018
Eschborn-Frankfurt